The 30th Golden Disc Awards ceremony was held on January 20–21, 2016. It was initially scheduled to be held at the Shenzhen Bay Sports Center in Shenzhen, China, but was instead staged at Kyung Hee University's Grand Peace Palace in Seoul due to security concerns. Jun Hyun-moo, Kim Jong-kook and Seohyun served as hosts on the first day, with Jun, Krystal and Leeteuk on the second.

Criteria
The winners of the digital music and album categories were determined by music sales (80%) and a panel of music experts (20%). The Rookie Artist of the Year award was based on album sales (80%), a panel of music experts (10%) and online votes (10%), while the Popularity Award was based on online votes (80%) and album sales (20%).

Winners and nominees

Main awards
Winners and nominees are listed in alphabetical order. Winners are listed first and emphasized in bold.

Special awards

References

2016 in South Korean music
2016 music awards
Golden Disc Awards ceremonies